Telangana state is the 12th most populous state in India, with a population of 35,003,674 as per 2011 Census, with a population density of 312 per km2. The state has male and female population of 17,611,633 and 17,392,041 respectively with sex ratio (Females per 1000 Males) standing at 988. Decadal Growth Rate (2001-2011) Rate is 13.58%.

General statistics
Data pulled from Socio Economic Outlook of Telangana 2023.

Population of Telangana State from 1961 to 2011 (in Nos.)

Percentage of Urban Population to total Population from 1961 to 2011

City religious population percentage
Religious Population Percentage for major CITIES of Telangana State, India.

† includes Buddhist, Sikhs etc.
Source: Cities with population of 1 Lakh and Above

References

See also
List of cities in Telangana by area

P
Culture of Telangana
Telangana